Jozef Obert (4 January 1938 – 18 October 2020), nicknamed Joschi during his career in Austria, was a Slovak football striker and later coach. He played for Slovan Bratislava, Rudá Hvězda Brno, Tatran Prešov and Wacker Innsbruck. He scored 92 goals at the Czechoslovak First League. He died 18 October 2020 in Bratislava.

Obert earned four caps for the Czechoslovakia national football team and debuted against Soviet Union in friendly match on 30 August 1958.

His grandson Adam Obert is a defender playing for Cagliari Calcio.

References

External links

1938 births
2020 deaths
People from Partizánske
Sportspeople from the Trenčín Region
Slovak footballers
Czechoslovak footballers
Czechoslovakia international footballers
ŠK Slovan Bratislava players
1. FC Tatran Prešov players
FC Wacker Innsbruck players
Slovak football managers
FC Red Bull Salzburg managers
ŠK Slovan Bratislava managers
FC VSS Košice managers
Slovak expatriate footballers
Czechoslovak expatriate footballers
Slovak expatriate sportspeople in Austria
Czechoslovak expatriate sportspeople in Austria
Association football forwards